Mario Vallotto (18 November 1933 – 22 April 1966) was an Italian cyclist. He won a gold medal in the team pursuit at the 1960 Summer Olympics. A year earlier he won the individual pursuit at the Mediterranean Games and finished second at the world championships.

References

1933 births
1966 deaths
Cyclists at the 1960 Summer Olympics
Olympic cyclists of Italy
Olympic gold medalists for Italy
Italian male cyclists
Olympic medalists in cycling
Medalists at the 1960 Summer Olympics
Mediterranean Games gold medalists for Italy
Competitors at the 1959 Mediterranean Games
Italian track cyclists
Mediterranean Games medalists in cycling
People from Mirano
Cyclists from the Metropolitan City of Venice